Balázs Nagy may refer to:

Balázs Nagy (figure skater) (born 1998), Hungarian-born American figure skater
Michel Varga (born Balázs Nagy; 1927–2015), Hungarian-French Trotskyist activist